This is a timeline of deportations of French Jews to Nazi extermination camps in German-occupied Europe during World War II. The overall total of Jews deported from France is a minimum of 75,721.

See also
The Holocaust in France
Camp du Récébédou
Drancy internment camp
Jewish ghettos in German-occupied Poland
Timeline of Treblinka
Vichy Holocaust collaboration timeline

Notes
 From August 26 to November 9, 1942, 15 convoys from France and a few from Belgium underwent a selection for a work detail at Kosel before arrival at Auschwitz; about 3,000 healthy men were taken, of whom about 2,000 were still alive on April 1, 1944, the day they were registered at Auschwitz.  Only 377 were still alive in 1945, constituting the largest group of survivors from those deported in 1942, not including 256 survivors from the first six convoys, which arrived in Auschwitz before gas chambers operations were begun in July 1942.
 The numbers of the convoys of December 7 and 17, 1943 were inverted by the Gestapo; we have maintained that order.
 In addition to the 73,853 total, the following are added:
Jews deported to Auschwitz from Nord and Pas-de-Calais (in France) through Belgium (about 1,000)
Jews married to prisoners of war and deported to Bergen-Belsen with their children (257)
Jews deported from Noé, Saint-Sulpice-la-Pointe, and Toulouse to Buchenwald on July 30, 1944 (at least 350)
Jews deported to Auschwitz from Clermont-Ferrand on August 22, 1944 (at least 68)
Jews deported to Auschwitz in convoys of "aryans" on July 8, 1942 and April 30, 1944 (at least 100)
Jews deported individually (at least 100)
Jews deported in resistance convoys (unknown)

The overall total of Jews deported from France is a minimum of 75,721.

References

The Holocaust in France
Nazi concentration camps in France
Auschwitz concentration camp
Sobibor extermination camp
Majdanek concentration camp
Buchenwald concentration camp
Kovno Ghetto
1942 in France
1943 in France
1944 in France
Deportations of French Jews to death camps
Deportations of French Jews to death camps
The Holocaust-related lists